James Thomas Walsh (born June 19, 1947) is an American Republican politician from Syracuse, New York. Currently a government affairs counselor for K & L Gates in Washington, DC, Walsh retired from the United States House of Representatives in 2009 after serving for twenty years.  Walsh represented a portion of Central New York, that is now known as the state's 24th Congressional District.

While in Congress, Walsh was a member of the United States House Committee on Appropriations for 16 years, also chairing several of its subcommittees. As chair of the United States House Appropriations Subcommittee on Military Construction, Veterans Affairs, and Related Agencies, alone, Walsh had spending oversight of more than $100 billion during the 109th Congress. In his capacities as chair and member of committees, subcommittees, and caucuses in Congress, Walsh secured hundreds of millions of dollars in federal funds for veterans affairs, healthcare, technology, the environment, higher educational institutions, and many other areas.

Walsh was further active in the peace process in Northern Ireland, for which the Walsh Visa was created and named in his honor. As co-founder and co-chair of the Congressional Hearing Health Caucus, Walsh secured passage of laws aimed at guaranteeing universal hearing screenings for newborns and infants in the United States. In 2009, an act that he proposed and which was enacted that achieved this effort was renamed for him in his honor, becoming known as the James T. Walsh Universal Newborn Hearing Screening Program. Walsh's change of perspective regarding both of then-President George W. Bush's troop surge of 2007 and ideology regarding the Iraq War, caused Walsh's views to gain headlines in the news media, as well as for additionally desiring a gradual withdrawal of American troops from Iraq.

For one decade during the 1970s and 1980s, Walsh was active on the Syracuse City Council, serving as its leader for five years. In 1999, he issued a challenge with several goals that is known as The Syracuse Neighborhood Initiative (SNI) for revitalization of the city. The many phases of SNI have been successful in improving neighborhoods and housing in numerous areas of the city.

Generally known as a moderate, pro-labor Republican, Walsh currently lives in Washington, DC with his wife, Dede. Walsh's father, William F. Walsh, served as Mayor of Syracuse during the 1960s, as well as a Republican Member of the United States House of Representatives in the 1970s, and his son, Ben Walsh, began serving as Mayor of Syracuse in 2018.

Early life and education
Walsh was born in Syracuse, New York, and graduated from St. Bonaventure University with a bachelor's degree in history.  He served in the Peace Corps in Nepal from 1970 to 1972 as an agricultural extension agent.

Early career

Walsh's early employment included that as a Social Services income examiner, and telephone company executive with both AT&T and NYNEX Telecommunications.  He served as Director of the Telecommunication Institute at the SUNY Utica-Rome, and taught telecommunication policy as an adjunct professor.

Syracuse City Council

At the same time, from 1978 to 1988, Walsh served on the City Council in Syracuse, New York both as a member and President.  for five consecutive years in each position.  During his 10 years on the Syracuse City Council, Walsh dedicated himself to improving and restoring the city.

United States House of Representatives

Elections 
Walsh ran as a Republican, and won a seat in the U.S. House of Representatives in 1988 in what was then the 27th District, handily defeating state Public Service Commissioner Rosemary S. Pooler.

Walsh was re-elected nine times, usually by fairly comfortable margins. The district, which was renumbered as the 25th District after the 1990 census, became increasingly Democratic in the 1990s due to the national Republican Party becoming more conservative. In 1996, he faced a reasonably well-financed challenge from Cortland attorney Marty Mack, and was held to only 53 percent of the vote. He faced his closest-ever race in 2006 against former congressional aide Dan Maffei, winning by only a 51% to 49% margin. He lost Onondaga County, the most populous county in the district and home to Syracuse, but was carried to victory by a strong showing in the more rural areas of the district.

With Maffei priming for a rematch against Walsh in 2008, Walsh announced that January that he would not run for an 11th term.  Maffei won the seat in November.

Political views
Walsh is generally thought of as a conservative Republican in his views and perspectives on political issues.

In the 109th Congress, Walsh voted along Republican party lines for 84% of his votes.  In the 110th Congress, Walsh's votes placed him as a centrist between Democrats and Republicans.

Throughout his twenty years in Congress, Walsh introduced 53 bills, co-sponsored nearly 1,700 bills, and enacted 10 bills.

Tenure and political positions

The War in Iraq

On September 10, 2007, Walsh stated that he favors a gradual withdrawal of American forces from Iraq.  This announcement came months after Walsh opposed President George W. Bush's troop surge of 2007.  Walsh claims that it was a result of personally going to Iraq, and finding that the Iraqi government and military have not done enough on their end.

Walsh supported a bipartisan bill that would set a withdrawal date for American troops to leave Iraq.

Veterans affairs

MilQual budget appropriations

As Chair of the Appropriation's Committee's Subcommittee on Military Construction, Veterans Affairs and Related Agencies during the 109th Congress, Walsh chaired Chair of MilQual, the third largest of the 10 appropriations budgets at approximately $115 billion.  In that capacity, Walsh had spending oversight for the Department of Veterans Affairs, Defense health programs, as well as all Department of Defense installation construction/improvement, and military family housing accounts.

Healthcare improvements for veterans

Walsh secured improvements in care for American veterans, particularly those in the Syracuse, New York area.  Included in federal funding secured by Walsh was $3.8 million that was used in the construction of the Syracuse Veterans Administration (VA) Medical Center Emergency Department, as well as $3.5 million for the medical center's MRI facility, and additional federal monies for the Spinal Cord Injury Center addition in 2008.

Hancock Air National Guard Base

Walsh proposed many bills aimed at funding for, and was supportive of, the Hancock Air National Guard Base in Syracuse during his tenure in Congress. The base was constructed in 1941 during World War II shortly after the attacks on Pearl Harbor. Originally known as the Syracuse Army Air Base (a.k.a. Mattydale Bomber Base), the base was renamed after Congressman Clarence E. Hancock and now serves as the home of the New York Air National Guard 174 Attack Wing (formerly 174 Fighter Wing), known as Hancock Field ANG Base. Syracuse Hancock International Airport, serving more than 2 million air travelers each year, is located across the street from the Hancock Field.

2008 National Military Appreciation Month event

Walsh attended an event on Capitol Hill in May 2008 to recognize National Military Appreciation Month.  Several United Service Organizations (USO) groups, including members of the USO Congressional Caucus, USO World Board of Governors, USO World Strategic Partners, Congress members, and senior military officials came together to fill 3,000 Operation USO Care Packages for American troops overseas, as well as to recognize the nearly 70-year history of the USO.  The USO is a non-profit organization that provides welfare, morale, and recreational services to American military personnel and their families.

Healthcare and related issues

Hearing health

Walsh was active in the passage of an act that guaranteed hearing screenings for newborns and infants.  In 1991, Walsh sponsored and introduced the Hearing Loss Testing Act.  The Newborn and Infant Screening and Intervention Program Act was authored and sponsored, mainly, by Walsh in 1999.  On March 11, 2009, the act was renamed as the James T. Walsh Universal Newborn Hearing Screening Program, and was identified within 42 United States Code 280g-1.  The Act is for "the early detection, diagnosis, and treatment regarding hearing loss in newborns and infants," and includes several provisions so that these endeavors may be accomplished.

Child nutrition

As a leader in child nutrition in the US, Walsh is nationally recognized through his support of both The Emergency Food Assistance Program (TEFAP) and the Women with Infants and Children program (WIC).  In the US House of Representatives, Walsh also sponsored the Hunger Has a Cure bill.

Stem cell research
Walsh has been an advocate of stem cell research, although he is opposed to using embryos as a source of the stem cells for such research.  Walsh explained in his former congressional blog in entry #2 about these of his perspectives regarding stem cell research.  In votes recorded from 1996 to 2007, however, he has consistently voted against bills regarding stem cell research, human cloning, and human embryo research.

Ireland, Northern Ireland, Peace Process, and Walsh Visa

Walsh is also known for his active and consistent efforts at supporting peace for Northern Ireland.  In 1995, Walsh was the chair of an historic delegation from Congress to Northern Ireland with President Bill Clinton, being the first visit of this type by a sitting US President. Following that time, Walsh led additional delegations, and was a Distinguished Delegation member, accompanying Clinton to Ireland in 1998 after the ratification of the Good Friday Agreement.

Through his efforts at promoting peace in Northern Ireland in the 1990s, created and established in 1998 was the Walsh Visa program, an exchange program for Irish adults to spend up to two years in the US, gaining enriching employment, educational, and conflict resolution experiences.  The Walsh Visa program, also known as The Irish Peace Process Cultural and Training Program, was sponsored by the United States Department of State, Bureau of European Affairs, ending in 2008.

In 2006, Walsh and both Congress Members Brian Higgins and Tim Murphy met with several government leaders in Ireland in which there was a confirmation announcement of the Irish Republican Army (IRA) weapons decommissioning.  Government leaders with whom the three congress members met included Irish Foreign Minister Dermot Ahern, Secretary of State for Northern Ireland Peter Hain, US Ambassador to Ireland James C. Kenny, US Ambassador to the United Kingdom Robert H. Tuttle, and the leadership of each of the main political parties involved in the process for peace.

In 2019, Walsh alongside a number of other Irish American political and civil society figures founded the bipartisan Ad Hoc Committee to Protect the Good Friday Agreement. He currently serves as co-chair of the committee alongside fellow co-chair, Democrat Bruce Morrison.

Immigration

Further, Walsh made efforts to assist many immigrants in the United States with obtaining citizenship.

The environment

Global warming

In 2004, Walsh was among co-sponsors of a US House bill to combat global warming.  The bill was the first of its kind to be introduced in the US House of Representatives.

Erie Canal and Erie Canalway National Heritage Corridor

In 2005, Walsh and Congress Member Brian Higgins worked together on a bipartisan approach to seeking funding for the redefinition of the New York State Canal System to be associated with the Erie Canal and Erie Canalway National Heritage Corridor Act of 2000.

Onondaga Lake clean-up

A supporter of cleaning up Onondaga Lake in New York State near Syracuse, Walsh achieved the securing of $160 million in federal funds for the effort.  Following many years of pollution by industrial waste and sewage overflow, the lake had become a public hazard.  The clean-up efforts have vastly improved the water quality of the lake, having reduced pollution and improved sewage treatment, as well as contributing to the area's economic value through tourism.

US Botanic Garden restoration

Walsh also led the restoration effort of the historic US Botanic Garden, one of the oldest in North America.

Peace Corps expansion

In 1998, the US House of Representatives considered expanding the Peace Corps, and Walsh spoke in Nepalese in a statement to the Committee on International Relations, expressing about his experiences as well as his support for the expansion of the program.

Federal funding for technology-related projects

Throughout his tenure in Congress, Walsh secured numerous technology-related grants, federal monies, and support valued at hundreds of millions of dollars for New York State and other states in America, a few of which include Michigan, Tennessee, and Florida.

Syracuse Neighborhood Initiative

In 1999, Walsh issued a challenge called The Syracuse Neighborhood Initiative (SNI) in support of these endeavors.  Goals of the Initiative included: "1) To position our neighborhoods to successfully compete for investment; 2) To improve the quality of life in our neighborhoods; 3) To strengthen community; [and] 4) To help neighborhood residents to build assets."

In 2004, Walsh secured nearly $5 million in federal funding for the SNI's Phase VI continued revitalization efforts for the City of Syracuse.

The year 2008 saw Walsh's efforts for SNI achieve $1.2 million in federal funding for Phase VIII of the project.  At that time, Walsh had secured more than $50 million in federal housing funding for the revitalization and improvement program.

Higher education institutional support

St. Bonaventure University

Included in the receipt of federal funds proposed by Walsh was his alma mater, St. Bonaventure University, in the construction and establishment of the William F. Walsh Science Center, named in honor of his father, in 2006, as well as for the renovation of the university's existing science building, De La Roche Hall.  Federal monies secured with his assistance for the Walsh Science Center totaled approximately $10 million, while nearly $1 million was obtained through HUD for refurbishment of De La Roche Hall.

Rochester Institute of Technology

Walsh has supported endeavors for the development of technology at the Rochester Institute of Technology (RIT), as announced in a 2001 press release from the Office of Congress Member Louise Slaughter.  Walsh and Slaughter announced that the House had passed a measure to provide the monies to RIT for the development of the Forest Fires Imaging Experimental System (FIRES), an experimental early warning and detection system regarding forest fires.

Syracuse University

Walsh is considered an influential figure in the sustaining of Syracuse University (SU). He has helped get funding for many projects run by SU, including Chancellor Nancy Cantor's Connective Corridor project.

Online poker and Internet gambling

Walsh is a staunch advocate of a federal prohibition of online poker. In 2006, he cosponsored House Resolution (H.R.) 4411, the Goodlatte-Leach Internet Gambling Prohibition and Enforcement Act and H.R. 4777, the Internet Gambling Prohibition Act.

Endorsement of Rudy Giuliani for President in 2008

Walsh was also a prominent endorser of Rudy Giuliani's presidential campaign.  In 2007, Giuliani gave $20,000 to four Congress members, including Walsh.

Official congressional blog

No longer maintained by the US House of Representatives since Walsh is not currently a congress member is his official congressional blog of two years, from 2006 to 2008.  Walsh titled his congressional blog, "Jim's Journal," and it consisted of 24 entries on various political topics.  Walsh created the congressional blog to better-inform his constituents about his perspectives.  Brief summaries of Walsh's congressional blog are currently housed in the Friedsam Memorial Library Archives of his alma mater, St. Bonaventure University.

Committee assignments and duties 
Despite the growing Democratic trend in his district, Walsh was able to hold onto his seat due to his long tenure on the House Appropriations Committee.  He was chairman of the Subcommittees on the Departments of Veterans Affairs, and Housing and Urban Development, and Independent Agencies from 2001 to 2007, thus making him one of the so-called "College of Cardinals," or "Cardinals of Spending," of the House due to his influence on national spending policies.  It is considered very difficult to unseat an Appropriations Committee member, especially if he or she is a "Cardinal."
 Assistant Majority Whip, 1994–2006

 United States House Committee on Appropriations, 1993–2009
 Chair, United States House Appropriations Subcommittee on District of Columbia
 Chair, United States House Appropriations Subcommittee on Legislative Branch
 Chair, Subcommittee on Military Construction, Veterans Affairs, and Related Agencies
 Chair, United States House Appropriations Subcommittee on Military Quality of Life and Veterans' Affairs
 Ranking Member, Subcommittee on Labor, Health and Human Services, Education and Related Agencies
 Subcommittee on Transportation, Housing and Urban Development, and Related Agencies
 Member, United States House Committee on Agriculture
 Member, United States House Select Committee on Children, Youth, and Families
 Member, United States House Committee on House Administration
 Co-Founder and Co-Chair, Congressional Hearing Health Caucus
 Ad Hoc Committee on Irish Affairs
 Friends of Ireland
 Co-Chair of the US-Irish Interparliamentary Group
 Army Caucus
 Congressional Automotive Caucus
 Congressional Boating Caucus
 Congressional Biomedical Research Caucus
 Congressional Caucus on Unfunded Mandates
 Congressional Competitiveness Caucus
 Congressional Fire Services Caucus
 Congressional Steel Caucus
 Minor League Baseball Caucus
 National Guard & Reserve Components Congressional Members Organization

Honors and awards 

In 2002, Walsh received a 2002 Ellis Island Medal of Honor for his efforts in working to promote the Irish Peace Process.  The award was presented to Walsh by the National Ethnic Coalition of Organizations, headquartered in New York City.

In June 2003, The Center of Excellence in Environmental Systems, an industry group, presented Congressman Walsh with the Syracuse University Willis H. Carrier Award. This award serves to honor Walsh for his years of service and commitment to protecting the environment and for helping to foster an economic hub for environmental technology through his financial support of the Center of Excellence in Environmental Systems (CoE-ES) and the New York Indoor Environmental Quality Center (NYIEQ).

Walsh has also received many additional awards, including the Exemplary Legislator Award from the Washington, DC National Alliance on Mental Illness – Veterans Council in 2006; Legislator of the Year from Washington, DC's Congressional Fire Services Institute in 2004; and Distinguished Service Award from The American Ireland Fund in Washington, DC in 2001.

Further, he was honored with the Capital Award from the National Council of La Raza in Washington, DC in 2001; Affordable Housing Champion from the National Council of State Housing Agencies in Washington, DC in 2000; and the Flax Trust Award from Flax Trust in Belfast, Northern Ireland in 1997.

Walsh also received the John Philip Sousa Distinguished Service Award in recognition for his efforts at preserving the historic Congressional Cemetery.

In 2013, Walsh, along with his wife, were honored by Le Moyne College at the school's annual Founder's Day Gala, where they received the Simon Le Moyne Award for outstanding leadership to the benefit of society. Given every year since 1968, the Simon Le Moyne Award represents the ideals and educational standards exemplified by the man whose name the College and the award signify. The Reverend Simon Le Moyne, a French Jesuit, was the first white man to visit the Syracuse area when the Onondaga Indians inhabited it.  Father Le Moyne established the first mission among the Onondagas in 1654.  During the same year, Father Le Moyne learned of the salt wells whose economic importance to the development of the City of Syracuse is an intrinsic part of its history. Ideally, the recipient of the Simon Le Moyne Award should be a person(s) cut of the same cloth as Father Le Moyne, an ambassador of peace and a person of faith.

Reflections of others

Rudy Giuliani has worked with Walsh, and made a statement in 2007 regarding his work with him.

Retirement and post-congressional work 
After retiring from the U.S. House, Walsh became a lobbyist and government affairs counselor for K & L Gates in Washington, DC.  K & L Gates is a law firm that maintains 48 offices throughout the world on five continents.

Walsh has consistently been included on The Hill's list of Top Lobbyists in 2013, 2014, and 2015.  Individuals named to this list have proven themselves as being able "to make things happen in Washington."

Community involvement
Walsh is active as a board member in several community organizations, with some having included Vera House, the Erie Canal Museum, the Syracuse Children's Chorus, and the Everson Museum of Art.  He is also a member of the Republican Main Street Partnership and ConservAmerica, formerly known as the Republicans for Environmental Protection.

Additionally, Walsh is a supporter of the Destiny USA project in Syracuse.  Walsh has also been a member of the 9 Mile Republican Club, an advisory council member for Catholic Schools, and Director of RESULTS, a group that is committed to ending hunger and fighting poverty.

Walsh is currently treasurer and board member of the US Association of Former Members of Congress.  He is also a member of the Board of Directors of the Washington Ireland Program; Cooperation Ireland; the Onondaga Environmental Institute; the US Soccer Foundation; the Finger Lakes Land Trust; and the American League of Lobbyists.  Additional board memberships include those with the Otisco Lake Association, the Onondaga Anglers Association, and the Oneida Lake Association.

Personal life
Walsh is married to wife, DeDe, and has three adult children, Jed, Ben, and Maureen. Ben Walsh refused to affiliate with the Republican Party and, when he chose to run for Mayor of Syracuse in 2017, did so on two minor party lines, the Independence Party of New York and Reform Party of New York State; in what was generally seen as an upset, Ben Walsh defeated Democratic Party frontrunner Juanita Perez Williams.

For recreation, Walsh enjoys skiing, hunting, and fishing.  In Syracuse, Walsh attended Most Holy Rosary Roman Catholic Church.

Walsh is the son of William and Mary Walsh.  Walsh's father, William F. Walsh, served as Mayor of Syracuse from 1961 to 1969, and represented both Central New York and the Finger Lakes region in the US House of Representatives from 1973 to 1979.

References

External links
 
 
 James T. Walsh: Government affairs counselor

1947 births
American expatriates in Nepal
Living people
Peace Corps volunteers
St. Bonaventure University alumni
Politicians from Syracuse, New York
Republican Party members of the United States House of Representatives from New York (state)
21st-century American politicians
Members of Congress who became lobbyists